HNLMS Pro Patria was a minelayer of the Royal Netherlands Navy (RNN). She was built in the Dutch East Indies and served between 1923 and 1942 in the RNN.

Design and construction 
Pro Patria was laid down in 1920 and launched on 17 July 1922 at the Marine Etablissement te Soerabaja (MES) in the Dutch East Indies. The ship was commissioned on 20 August 1923. It was the first warship to be fully built at the MES. After being commissioned the ship was also used as listening school and as torpedo work ship (Dutch: Torpedowerkschip).

Service history 
During the Second World War the ship mined several waters in the Dutch East Indies.

On 15 February 1942 Pro Patria was scuttled in the Moesi River above Palembang by its crew.

Notes

Citations

References

Minelayers of the Royal Netherlands Navy
Ships built in the Dutch East Indies
World War II minelayers of the Netherlands
1922 ships